Graham Ross (5 July 1928 – 13 February 2009) was a  international rugby union footballer, who played as a fly-half.

Rugby union career

Amateur career

Ross played for Watsonians.

He also played for Edinburgh Academicals and Wasps.

Provincial career

Ross played for Edinburgh District. He played in Scottish Inter-District Championship. He played in the 1954–55 season.

He played for the Co-Optimists.

International career

He was capped for  four times in 1954.

Business career

Ross trained in the Scottish Hotel School and then worked in the Savoy Hotel in London and then in Switzerland.

He joined McVities Guest in 1955 as a Catering Director.

This was taken over by Rank Hovis MacDougall in 1963. Ross worked for them before setting up his own company Ross's Restaurants.

He sold the company to United Biscuits in 1975.

He became the Managing Director of Crawford Catering Company.

In 1981 he worked as an Executive Director of Scottish Business in the Community. Ross set up 47 Local Enterprise trusts around Scotland creating jobs.

He received an OBE in 1990.

References

1928 births
2009 deaths
Scottish rugby union players
Scotland international rugby union players
Watsonians RFC players
Edinburgh District (rugby union) players
Rugby union players from Edinburgh
Co-Optimist Rugby Club players
Edinburgh Academicals rugby union players
Wasps RFC players
Rugby union fly-halves